The Embassy of Brazil in London is the diplomatic mission of Brazil in the United Kingdom.

The Brazilian ambassador's residence is located in a separate building at 54 Mount Street, Mayfair, as is the Consular section which is at 3-4 Vere Street, Marylebone. Brazil also maintain an Office of the Naval Adviser at 170 Upper Richmond Road, Putney and an Office of the Air Adviser/Brazil Aeronautical Commission In Europe at 16 Great James Street, Bloomsbury.

The Embassy moved to its current location in Cockspur Street in 2011, from Green Street, Mayfair.

Gallery

References

Bibliography

External links
Official site

Brazil
Diplomatic missions of Brazil
Brazil–United Kingdom relations
Grade II listed buildings in the City of Westminster
Buildings and structures in the London Borough of Wandsworth
Buildings and structures in the London Borough of Camden